Andrew Blair (born 18 December 1959) is a former footballer who was born in Scotland but grew up in England and spent his career in English football. He played in the Aston Villa team that beat Barcelona 3–0 at Villa Park to win the 1982 European Super Cup.

Football career
Born in Kirkcaldy, Fife, Blair grew up in Bedworth, Warwickshire, and was educated at Nicholas Chamberlaine School in the town. He made his league debut for Coventry City, whom he had joined as an apprentice, on 28 October 1978 in a 2–1 win against Birmingham City. He also played top-flight football at Aston Villa (in two separate spells) where he won the Charity Shield in 1981 (shared) and the European Cup in 1982 as an unused substitute. Blair also played for Sheffield Wednesday and on loan at Wolverhampton Wanderers.

In November 1984, while playing for Sheffield Wednesday against Luton Town, he achieved the unusual distinction of being the first player to ever score a hat-trick of penalties in the League Cup.

He also appeared for Barnsley and Northampton Town, before a knee injury ended his professional career in 1989, at the age of 30. He is currently working as a scout for Stoke City.

Personal life
Blair's son Matty also played for Kidderminster Harriers, and currently plays for Football League Two side Cheltenham Town.

References

1959 births
Living people
People from Bedworth
Scottish footballers
Association football midfielders
Aston Villa F.C. players
Barnsley F.C. players
Coventry City F.C. players
Northampton Town F.C. players
Sheffield Wednesday F.C. players
Wolverhampton Wanderers F.C. players
English Football League players
Scotland under-21 international footballers
Footballers from Kirkcaldy
English footballers
English people of Scottish descent